is a former Japanese football player.

Playing career
Yuya Nakamura played for J2 League club; Kyoto Sanga FC and V-Varen Nagasaki from 2013 to 2014.

Club statistics

References

External links

1987 births
Living people
Kansai University alumni
Association football people from Nagasaki Prefecture
Japanese footballers
J2 League players
Japan Football League players
Honda FC players
Kyoto Sanga FC players
V-Varen Nagasaki players
Association football midfielders